Balmoral railway station is located in the townland of Ballygammon in south Belfast, County Antrim, Northern Ireland. The station opened on 1 November 1858. The platform was extended by 45 metres in 1870 and the station has been unstaffed since October 1966.

It is located near the King's Hall, an exhibition and concert venue and home of the Royal Ulster Agricultural Society.

Station house
There is a station house, which was built in the style of the Great Northern Railway of Ireland, it is now in private ownership and has been extended by the owner.

Service
Extra trains run at peak times, and the service reduces to hourly operation in the evenings.

On Sundays there is an hourly service in each direction.

References

External links
 Train services from Balmoral

Railway stations in Belfast
Railway stations opened in 1858
Railway stations served by NI Railways
Railway stations in Northern Ireland opened in the 19th century